Moon Lake State Forest Recreation Area is a , recreation area within Pinchot State Forest in Plymouth Township, Luzerne County, Pennsylvania. It is open for mountain biking, hiking, fishing, bird watching, and nature study. Moon Lake SFRA is in the Delaware and Lehigh National Heritage Corridor. It is located near Pennsylvania Route 29 on the western edge of the Scranton—Wilkes-Barre—Hazleton metropolitan statistical area.

Geography

Hydrology 
The lake is located centrally in the park. Moon Lake resides in the Susquehanna River Basin—a Warm Water Fishery. It is a passageway for migrating fish. Specifically, Moon Lake is in the Hunlock Creek watershed—a Cold Water Fishery. Forested land serves as a riparian buffer from development around the lake. Throughout the park are many wetlands, spring speeds, vernal ponds, and small streams. The hydrological connection between Moon Lake and the Susquehanna River is as follows. Moon Lake empties into Tributary 28303, which empties into Tributary 28301, which merges into Hunlock Creek, and finally flows directly into the Susquehanna River. From there, water reaches the Chesapeake Bay and Atlantic Ocean.

Biology

Flora 
Moon Lake Recreation Area has diverse habitats from upland forests to low-lying wetlands near the lake. The upland forests are part of the Appalachian-Blue Ridge forest ecoregion. Tree species include hickories, red maple, and tuliptree (Liriodendron tulipifera). On the lower slopes, red and white oaks are present. On the drier ridge tops and upper slopes, chestnut and both black and white oaks dominate. Conifer cover, including white pine (Pinus strobus) and eastern hemlock (Tsuga canadensis), is present throughout the park. The dense understory is various shrubs—particularly mountain laurel (Kalmia latifolia) and blackberry. Other understory species are present including hay-scented and New York ferns, striped maple, spicebush, black birch, and hornbeam.

A wetland system adjoins the northeast corner of the lake. It is of the type: Palustrine scrub-shrub broadleaf /emergent (Phragmites australis). It is seasonally flooded or saturated. Four wetlands are listed on the National Wetlands Inventory map.

Fauna 
Wild turkey, grey squirrel, woodchuck, cottontail rabbit, Canada goose, mallard duck, black duck, American woodcock (Scolopax minor), ruffed grouse, chipmunk, raccoon, white-tailed deer (Odocoileus virginianus) and various songbirds populate the park. Also found were opossum, raccoon, mink, muskrat, coyote, fox, porcupine, and American black bear (Ursus americanus). Copperhead snakes (Agkistrodon contortrix) are also present in the park. There are no threatened or endangered species in the park.

Recreation

Mountain bike trail system 
Approximately  of purpose-built mountain bike trails also provide opportunities for hiking, cross-country skiing, orienteering, and nature watching along a stacked-loop trail system. Trails range from wide and smooth to narrow, rocky and technical singletrack. There many optional rock overs with go arounds. The park features Deacon Trials Area, a mountain bike trials and skills area. The main trailhead is located at the front entrance to the park on Atherton Rd, off State Route 29. ATVs, snowmobiles, and motorboats are prohibited. The trail network is maintained by volunteer groups. It is open year-round.

Fishing 
Fishing is common and permitted on Moon Lake. Moon Lake is stocked yearly with thousands of trout by the Pennsylvania Fish and Boat Commission. In the winter, ice fishing on the lake is popular.

Model Airplane Airfield 
Radio-controlled flying is an activity at the park. A private sporting club, the Wyoming Valley RC Flyers, leases a southern section of the park at the Model Airplane Airfield. The club flies radio-controlled aircraft on an estimated  of open meadows. The airfield includes a pavilion, landing strip, fence separating spectator areas from airfield-operation areas, picnic tables, and a gravel access road.

History
Throughout its history, Moon Lake has supported both passive and active recreational opportunities for the general public. Passive uses had included hiking, fishing, bird watching, and nature study. These activities were generally separated from the active and developed areas of the park. Active uses had included boating, picnicking, camping, swimming, disc golf, baseball, softball, tennis, and soccer. At its peak, Moon Lake Park had attracted 150,000 visitors annually.

Opening 
Moon Lake Park was established as part of the Luzerne County Park System in 1968. Luzerne County officials had intended to provide residents with open space for recreation. That year, federal and state funds had become available through the Project 70 Land Acquisition and Borrowing Act. These funds allowed Luzerne County to purchase , including Moon Lake itself.

A swimming pool was built in 1968 as part of the original infrastructure of the park. It is an L-shaped, Olympic-sized pool. The pool included an asphalt parking lot, concrete sidewalks, bathhouse, pool and deck, lawn areas of suntanning, patios, a concession area, and stone landscape walls.During a heatwave in the summer of 1993, 10,000 swimmers visited the swimming pool in a single month.

Athletic fields were built in the west central section of the park near Deerwood Drive. These fields included a softball and multi-use field. Game courts were also built. The game courts include 3 tennis courts and 1 basketball court. The surface is bituminous paving topped with colored sealer. Also built as part of the original construction of the park was a marina. The marina is located along the eastern shore of Moon Lake. It included a marina building, bulkhead, and floating docks. The marina building contained restrooms and a concession for boat rentals.

The campground contained individual sites and tent/trailer sites. Some sites had been equipped with electric service. Others could accommodate larger RVs. Later, a Nature Education Center was built. In addition to the main building, there are two outdoor group meeting shelters and a large group picnic pavilion. Paved handicap parking spaces are available.

In 1994, two women were struck and killed by a single lightning strike at Moon Lake Park. The women were killed when lightning struck a wooden pavilion they had taken shelter under.

Expansion and partial closure 
However, the addition is for administrative purposes. Other improvements were made possible by a 2005 grant from the Pennsylvania Department of Conservation and Natural Resources. Additional picnic pavilions and picnic tables were built. A roll-in aluminum dock system was installed on Moon Lake.

Later, in 2008, an extensive network of mountain biking trails was built. Trail building was a cooperative effort with Moon Lake Park staff and local groups of mountain bikers. This public-private partnership greatly expanded the trail network. The trails are among the primary uses of the park today.

Luzerne County began to cut funding for the park in the late 2000s. In 2007, Luzerne County budgeted $575,000 for Moon Lake Park. By 2011, funding had dwindled to $119,626. The swimming pool, public restrooms, and Nature Education Center closed in 2009. Campgrounds closed in 2010. Much of the existing infrastructure had deteriorated from vandalism and lack of maintenance. At the time, Moon Lake Park remained open for passive activities like mountain biking, hiking, and fishing.

Renaming 
On December 22, 2014, the Luzerne County Council voted to transfer ownership of the park to the Commonwealth of Pennsylvania. Council also transferred Seven Tubs Natural Area and a  parcel adjacent to Moon Lake Park. Council said that "[PA DCNR] will do a better job managing the county sites for recreation. On June 30, 2015, Governor Wolf signed Senate Bill 699 transferring ownership of Moon Lake County Park to the Commonwealth under the administration of the Pennsylvania Department of Conservation and Natural Resources (DCNR.) DCNR plans to continue to permit mountain biking, hiking, and fishing; but remove permanent structures like the swimming pool and front office. Further plans may include building a connecting trail from Moon Lake Park to the Susquehanna River. " Under the plan, Luzerne County received a few thousand dollars in lieu of taxes. Luzerne County also keeps mineral rights for 25 years. On October 26, 2015, Luzerne County finalized the transfer of Moon Lake Park to the Commonwealth of Pennsylvania. In 2015, the park was renamed Moon Lake State Forest Recreation Area and is included in the Pinchot State Forest system.  Most of the existing structures will be demolished.

Nearby attractions

Parks 
 Ricketts Glen State Park
 Frances Slocum State Park
 Nescopeck State Park
 Susquehanna Warrior Trail
 Pinchot State Forest

Mountain bike trail systems 
 Lackawanna State Park
 Dick and Nancy Eales Preserve at Moosic Mountain
 Merli-Sarnoski County Park

References

External links
 Moon Lake Park Trail Map

Parks in Luzerne County, Pennsylvania
Protected areas established in 1968
Protected areas of Luzerne County, Pennsylvania
Tourist attractions in Luzerne County, Pennsylvania